J. H. Frimpong-Ansah (22 October 1930 – 21 April 1999) was an economist and a Governor of the Bank of Ghana. He was governor from 8 March 1968 to 28 February 1973.

References

 

20th-century Ghanaian economists
Governors of Bank of Ghana
1999 deaths
1930 births
Presbyterian Boys' Senior High School alumni